Spring Ridge is census-designated place (CDP) and suburban housing community in Frederick County, in the U.S. state of Maryland, just outside the city of Frederick. As of the 2020 census it had a population of 6,005. Before 2010, it was part of the Linganore-Bartonsville, Maryland census-designated place, which was split into three for the 2010 census.

Geography
Spring Ridge is in east-central Frederick County, bordered to the west, across the Monocacy River, by the city of Frederick; to the north by Linganore Creek; to the east, at Meadow Road, by the Linganore CDP; and to the south, across Maryland Route 144, by the Bartonsville CDP. Interstate 70 runs through the middle of the Spring Ridge CDP, leading west  to Frederick and east  to the Baltimore Beltway. Primary access to the community is via the Spring Ridge Parkway from MD 144.

Demographics

References

Census-designated places in Frederick County, Maryland
Census-designated places in Maryland